The 1932 United States Senate elections in Arizona took place on November 8, 1932. Incumbent Democratic U.S. Senator Carl Hayden ran for reelection to a second term, again defeating his 1926 challenger former U.S. Senator Ralph H. Cameron in the general election.

Hayden, then U.S. Congressman for Arizona's at-large Congressional district, was elected to his first term in 1926 when he defeated the incumbent Cameron, and would be successfully reelected to his second term in a rematch in 1932, by a wide margin. Candidates from the Socialist and Communist Parties also ran in the election, but did not garner much support, barely registering at 1% or less. This would be Cameron's final attempt at returning to the U.S. Senate, leaving Arizona soon after, and living for a time in both Philadelphia and Los Angeles.

Democratic primary
The Democratic primary was held on September 8, 1932. Incumbent U.S. Senator Carl T. Hayden received significant opposition in the primary from Harlow W. Akers, an attorney. Hayden went on to win his party's nomination, however.

Candidates
 Carl T. Hayden, incumbent U.S. Senator
 Harlow W. Akers, attorney
 William J. Fellows
 Walter H. Colyar, Salt River valley miner

Results

Republican primary

Candidates
 Ralph H. Cameron, former U.S. Senator
 Hoval A. Smith, nominee for U.S. Senate in 1912 (Class 3)

Results

General election

See also 
 United States Senate elections, 1932

References 
Citations

Sources

 
 

1932
Arizona
United States Senate